Charles Burt Hay (4 November 1881 – 21 August 1945) was an Australian rules footballer who played with Carlton and Essendon  in the Victorian Football League (VFL).

Notes

External links 

Charlie Hay's profile at Blueseum

1881 births
Carlton Football Club players
Essendon Football Club players
Australian rules footballers from South Australia
1945 deaths